The 2019-20 Clarkson Golden Knights Men's ice hockey season was the 98th season of play for the program and the 59th season in the ECAC Hockey conference. The Golden Knights represented the Clarkson University and played their home games at Cheel Arena, and were coached by Casey Jones, in his 9th season.

On March 12, ECAC Hockey announced that the remainder of the tournament was cancelled due to the COVID-19 pandemic.

Roster

As of September 12, 2019.

Standings

Schedule and Results

|-
!colspan=12 style=";" | Exhibition

|-
!colspan=12 style=";" | Regular Season

|-
!colspan=12 style=";" | 
|- align="center" bgcolor="#e0e0e0"
|colspan=12|Remainder of Tournament Cancelled

Scoring Statistics

Goaltending statistics

Rankings

Players drafted into the NHL

2020 NHL Entry Draft

† incoming freshman

References

Clarkson Golden Knights men's ice hockey seasons
Clarkson Golden Knights 
Clarkson Golden Knights 
2019 in sports in New York (state)
2020 in sports in New York (state)